Christopher Barclay Sole (born 27 February 1994) is a Scottish cricketer. He made his first-class debut in the 2015–17 ICC Intercontinental Cup on 9 August 2016 against the United Arab Emirates. He made his One Day International (ODI) debut in the 2015–17 ICC World Cricket League Championship on 16 August 2016, also against the United Arab Emirates. He made his Twenty20 International (T20I) debut for Scotland against Oman on 19 January 2017 in the 2017 Desert T20 Challenge. In September 2021, Sole was named in Scotland's provisional squad for the 2021 ICC Men's T20 World Cup.

His father, David, played rugby union for Scotland and his brother, Tom, also plays cricket for Scotland.

References

External links
 

1994 births
Living people
Scottish cricketers
Scotland One Day International cricketers
Scotland Twenty20 International cricketers
Place of birth missing (living people)